Drones is a 2010 office comedy film directed by Amber Benson and Adam Busch, who describe it as "The Office meets Close Encounters".

Cast
 Jonathan M. Woodward as Brian
 Samm Levine as Clark
 James Urbaniak as Pete
 Dave Allen as Cooperman
 Tangi Miller as Miryam
 Marc Evan Jackson as Ian
 Angela Bettis as Amy
 Paul F. Tompkins as Jafe

Production
Drones was filmed in the Baton Rouge area.

Release
Drones premiered at the 2010 Slamdance Film Festival in January 2010.

References

External links
 
 
 

2010 films
2010 comedy films
American comedy films
2010s English-language films
Films shot in Louisiana
American independent films
Workplace comedy films
Films directed by Amber Benson
2010 independent films
2010s American films